In mathematics, the unit doublet is the derivative of the Dirac delta function.  It can be used to differentiate signals in electrical engineering: If u1 is the unit doublet, then

 

where  is the convolution operator.

The function is zero for all values except zero, where its behaviour is interesting. Its integral over any interval enclosing zero is zero. However, the integral of its absolute value over any region enclosing zero goes to infinity. The function can be thought of as the limiting case of two rectangles, one in the second quadrant, and the other in the fourth. The length of each rectangle is k, whereas their breadth is 1/k2, where k tends to zero.

References

Generalized functions